State Of Flow is the Swedish punk group No Fun at All's fourth album, released on 25 April 2000.

Music by Mikael Danielsson, Krister Johansson, Kjell Ramstedt and Stefan Neuman.
Lyrics by Ingemar Jansson.

Track listing
 "Celestial Q&A"
 "Waste Of Time"  
 "Second Best"
 "Stumble And Fall"
 "Not In The Mood" 
 "My Extraordinary Mind"
 "FM Vanity"
 "Joe Delord"
 "Perfect Sense"
 "Lessons Never Learned"
 "The Slanderous Clientele" 
 "ESDS"
 "Time Machine" (Bonus track on Japanese version, Sadistic Mika Band cover)

2000 albums
No Fun at All albums
Burning Heart Records albums